Affordance is what the environment offers the individual. American psychologist James J. Gibson coined the term in his 1966 book, The Senses Considered as Perceptual Systems, and it occurs in many of his earlier essays. However, his best-known definition is taken from his seminal 1979 book, The Ecological Approach to Visual Perception:

The word is used in a variety of fields: perceptual psychology, cognitive psychology, environmental psychology, criminology, industrial design, human–computer interaction (HCI), interaction design, user-centered design, communication studies, instructional design, science, technology and society (STS), sports science and artificial intelligence.

Original development 
Gibson developed the concept of affordance over many years, culminating in his final book, The Ecological Approach to Visual Perception in 1979. He defined an affordance as what the environment provides or furnishes the animal. Notably, Gibson compares an affordance with an ecological niche emphasizing the way niches characterize how an animal lives in its environment. 

The key to understanding affordance is that it is relational and characterizes the suitability of the environment to the observer, and so, depends on their current intentions and their capabilities. This notion of intention/needs is critical to an understanding of affordance, as it explains how the same aspect of the environment can provide different affordances to different people, and even to the same individual at another point in time. As Gibson puts it, “Needs control the perception of affordances (selective attention) and also initiate acts.”

Affordances were further studied by Eleanor J. Gibson, wife of James J. Gibson, who created her theory of perceptual learning around this concept. Her book, An Ecological Approach to Perceptual Learning and Development, explores affordances further.

Gibson's is the prevalent definition in cognitive psychology. According to Gibson, humans tend to alter and modify their environment so as to change its affordances to better suit them. On his view, humans change the environment to make it easier to live in (even if making it harder for other animals to live in it): to keep warm, to see at night, to rear children, and to move around. This tendency to change the environment is natural to humans, and Gibson argues that it is a mistake to treat the social world apart from the material world or the tools apart from the natural environment. He points out that manufacturing was originally done by hand as a kind of manipulation. Gibson argues that learning to perceive an affordance is an essential part of socialization. 

The theory of affordances introduces a "value-rich ecological object".  Affordances cannot be described within the value-neutral language of physics, but rather introduces notions of benefits and injuries to someone. An affordance captures this beneficial/injurious aspect of objects and relates them to the animal for whom they are well/ill-suited. During childhood development, a child learns to perceive not only the affordances for the self, but also how those same objects furnish similar affordances to another. A child can be introduced to the conventional meaning of an object by manipulating which objects command attention and demonstrating how to use the object through performing its central function. By learning how to use an artifact, a child “enters into the shared practices of society” as when they learn to use a toilet or brush their teeth. And so, by learning the affordances, or conventional meaning of an artifact, children learn the artifact's social world and further, become a member of that world.

Anderson, Yamagishi and Karavia (2002) found that merely looking at an object primes the human brain to perform the action the object affords.

As perceived action possibilities 
In 1988, Donald Norman appropriated the term affordances in the context of Human–Computer Interaction to refer to just those action possibilities that are readily perceivable by an actor. This new definition of "action possibilities" has now become synonymous with Gibson's work, although Gibson himself never made any reference to action possibilities in any of his writing. Through Norman's book The Design of Everyday Things, this interpretation was popularized within the fields of HCI, interaction design, and user-centered design. It makes the concept dependent not only on the physical capabilities of an actor, but also on their goals, beliefs, and past experiences. If an actor steps into a room containing an armchair and a softball, Gibson's original definition of affordances allows that the actor may throw the chair and sit on the ball, because this is objectively possible. Norman's definition of (perceived) affordances captures the likelihood that the actor will sit on the armchair and throw the softball. Effectively, Norman's affordances "suggest" how an object may be interacted with. For example, the size, shape, and weight of a softball make it perfect for throwing by humans, and it matches their past experience with similar objects. The focus on perceived affordances is much more pertinent to practical design problems , which may explain its widespread adoption.

Norman later explained that this restriction of the term's meaning had been unintended, and in his 2013 update of The Design of Everyday Things, he added the concept "signifiers". In the digital age, designers were learning how to indicate what actions were possible on a smartphone's touchscreen, which didn't have the physical properties that Norman intended to describe when he used the word "affordances".

However, the definition from his original book has been widely adopted in HCI and interaction design, and both meanings are now commonly used in these fields.

Following Norman's adaptation of the concept, affordance has seen a further shift in meaning where it is used as an uncountable noun, referring to the easy discoverability of an object or system's action possibilities, as in "this button has good affordance". This in turn has given rise to use of the verb afford – from which Gibson's original term was derived – that is not consistent with its dictionary definition (to provide or make available): designers and those in the field of HCI often use afford as meaning "to suggest" or "to invite".

The different interpretations of affordances, although closely related, can be a source of confusion in writing and conversation if the intended meaning is not made explicit and if the word is not used consistently. Even authoritative textbooks can be inconsistent in their use of the term.

When affordances are used to describe information and communications technology (ICT) an analogy is created with everyday objects with their attendant features and functions. Yet, ICT's features and functions derive from the product classifications of its developers and designers. This approach emphasizes an artifact’s convention to be wholly located in how it was designed to be used. In contrast, affordance theory draws attention to the fit of the technology to the activity of the user and so lends itself to studying how ICTs may be appropriated by users or even misused. One meta-analysis reviewed the evidence from a number of surveys about the extent to which the Internet is transforming or enhancing community. The studies showed that the internet is used for connectivity locally as well as globally, although the nature of its use varies in different countries. It found that internet use is adding on to other forms of communication, rather than replacing them.

False affordances 
William Gaver divided affordances into three categories: perceptible, hidden, and false.

 A false affordance is an apparent affordance that does not have any real function, meaning that the actor perceives possibilities for action that are nonexistent. A good example of a false affordance is a placebo button.
 Affordance is said to be hidden when there are possibilities for action, but these are not perceived by the actor. For example, it is not apparent from looking at a shoe that it could be used to open a wine bottle.
 Affordance is said to be perceptible when there is information available such that the actor perceives and can then act upon the existing affordance.

This means that, when affordances are perceptible, they offer a direct link between perception and action, and, when affordances are hidden or false, they can lead to mistakes and misunderstandings.

Affordance in robotics 

Problems in robotics indicate that affordance is not only a theoretical concept from psychology. In object grasping and manipulation, robots need to learn the affordance of objects in the environment, i.e., to learn from visual perception and experience (a) whether objects can be manipulated, (b) to learn how to grasp an object, and (c) to learn how to manipulate objects to reach a particular goal. As an example, the hammer can be grasped, in principle, with many hand poses and approach strategies, but there is a limited set of effective contact points and their associated optimal grip for performing the goal.

Affordances in language education 
Based on Gibson’s conceptualization of affordances as both the good and bad that the environment offers animals, affordances in language learning are both the opportunities and challenges that learners perceive of their environment when learning a language. Affordances, which are both learning opportunities or inhibitions, arise from the semiotic budget of the learning environment, which allows language to evolve. Positive affordances, or learning opportunities, are only effective in developing learner's language when they perceive and actively interact with their surroundings. Negative affordances, on the other hand, are crucial in exposing the learners’ weaknesses for teachers, and the learners themselves, to address their moment-to-moment needs in their learning process.

See also 
 Action-specific perception
 Ambient optic array
 Default effect
 Form follows function
 Usability

References

Further reading

External links 

A series of slides concerning theories of vision and (incidentally) the role of affordances and some interesting optical illusions concerning affordances 

Action (philosophy)
Perception
Psychological theories